Henry Donnelly may refer to:

 Henry Edmund Donnelly (1904–1967), American bishop of the Catholic Church
 Henry Grattan Donnelly (1850–1931), American author and playwright